Haïzer District is a district of Bouïra Province, Algeria.

Municipalities
The district is further divided into 2 municipalities:
Haizer
Taghzout 

Districts of Bouïra Province